Sorindeia calantha is a species of plant in the family Anacardiaceae. It is native to Kenya and Tanzania. Its habitat is lowland riverine forest.

References

calantha
Flora of Kenya
Flora of Tanzania
Taxonomy articles created by Polbot